Community Baptist Christian School is a small private Christian school located in Shields, Michigan,  which is a suburb of Saginaw, Michigan. It was started by Community Baptist Church in 1981. As of 2013, it enrolls approximately 110 students.

Sports
Community Baptist Christian School has many options for sports, including men's soccer, ladies volleyball, men's and ladies' basketball, and men's wrestling. Community plays competitively against other Christian schools in MACS.

References

External links
 
 Community Baptist Christian School

Baptist schools in the United States
Christian schools in Michigan
Private high schools in Michigan
Educational institutions established in 1982
Schools in Saginaw County, Michigan
Saginaw Intermediate School District
1981 establishments in Michigan